WWE SmackDown vs. Raw 2007 is a professional wrestling video game developed by Yuke's and published by THQ in 2006. It is the third game under the WWE SmackDown vs Raw name, the eighth game overall in the video game series based on the World Wrestling Entertainment (WWE) professional wrestling promotion, and is the successor to 2005's WWE SmackDown! vs. Raw 2006. The game was first announced on 31 March 2006, and was released worldwide in November 2006 for PlayStation 2 and Xbox 360, and a month later for PlayStation Portable. The Xbox 360 version was the first game in the series to be published on a seventh generation video game console. A PlayStation 3 version was also planned as a launch title but was later canceled.

New features introduced included an analog control system, interactive hotspots, and fighting within the arena crowd. The game also included several improvements on the previous game's existing match types and modes. 

SmackDown vs. Raw 2007 was succeeded by WWE SmackDown vs. Raw 2008 in 2007.

Gameplay

Match gameplay
THQ said they would bring a more realistic fighting experience with a new analog control grappling system, enabling the player to throw their opponent anywhere they want, in contrast to previous preset animations. In the new system, grappling moves are now affected by analog control, in contrast to the button-based system from preceding games. Much like the previous game, one can also move around the ring by analog control instead of using the D-pad. An option to switch to the previous control layout is also possible. The chain reversal system has also been improved and now involves grapples as well as strikes.

The Category 1 and Category 2 movesets are determined by weight-class now, so lighter wrestlers have access to martial arts or luchador move-sets, while heavier wrestlers have access to more power moves. In addition, a wrestler can only lift up or hurt with certain strikes, wrestlers one weight class heavier than them or less.
The game features several arenas that WWE held events at in 2005 and 2006.There are also arenas based on each WWE television show.

A lot more interactivity in the arenas is also present such as fighting within the crowd. Signs and objects from the crowd can be used to beat down the opponent. One major feature is the inclusion of environmental "hotspots" such as the ring ropes, steel steps and scaffolding which players can interact with. The PlayStation 2 version however has a restriction on crowd fighting and interaction for specific match types.

The graphics have also improved with each superstar consisting of 20,000 polygons for the Xbox 360 compared to the total of 5,000 from the PlayStation 2 version of the previous game. Sweat from the wrestlers has now been included in the Xbox 360 version of the game. The game's audio system has been overhauled and features new sound effects in Dolby 5.1 as well as the inclusion of new crowd chants and grunting from the wrestlers.

Characters

WWE SmackDown vs. Raw 2007 marks the video game debuts of 16 superstars.

Cory Ledesma, creative manager of WWE SmackDown vs. Raw 2007, confirmed that the game has no new match types. However, there are improvements in existing match types. The Money in the Bank variant to the ladder match is now added and all ladder matches feature more flexibility in placing the ladders. The player now has to use the analog sticks as hands and arms to retrieve the match's prize.

The tables match has also undergone a complete overhaul, requiring players to build up momentum for a finisher and damage their opponent enough before being able to put them through a table, and making one of an opponent's limbs red.

This also marked the first game since WWE SmackDown! Shut Your Mouth to not feature a diva-specific match stipulation with the Fulfill Your Fantasy match from the previous game removed.

This is the last game in the series to feature Chris Benoit. Initially, he was supposed to be in the follow up game WWE SmackDown vs. Raw 2008 before the double murder and suicide in June 2007.

Create modes
For the Create-A-Superstar mode, singer Lemmy's face is put in the game as a template.

The Create-An-Entrance mode has been improved with a new preview mode. As well as instantaneous previews of the entrances when the player makes a change, one can also specifically set the timing for camera angles, pyrotechnics and other effects. Despite the Xbox 360's hard drive and MP3 capability, the game is unable to recognize any music the player may have saved onto the console's hard drive, unlike previous WWE games for the original Xbox, which allowed players to set custom entrance music.

There is also a Create-A-Stable mode, which allows the player to make a tag-team, alliance, or a stable with up to five members. This also allows the player to come out in the same entrance as their teammates, unlike many other WWE games.

Inspired by John Cena's custom spinner championship belts, the ability to create belts with spinning centerpieces in the returning Create-A-Championship mode is now possible. The player also has the ability to manually spin these belts during an entrance. The championship belts from the previous game are included in this game in addition to created belts. These include the belts used by WWE in 2006: the WWE, World Heavyweight, Intercontinental, United States, World Tag Team, WWE Tag Team, Women's and Cruiserweight championships. Stone Cold Steve Austin's "Smoking Skull" belt and the nWo's version of the WCW World Heavyweight Championship joined Ted DiBiase's Million Dollar Championship and the WWE Hardcore Championship as classic belts that can also be won and defended in the game.

Release

The official demo for WWE SmackDown vs. Raw 2007 was released on the Xbox Live Marketplace on 28 September 2006, containing a No-DQ match between Triple H and Kane.

Like the previous game, the game was released on the PlayStation 2 and the PlayStation Portable. While the series has traditionally been exclusive to the PlayStation series of consoles, this game was released on Xbox 360 after a series of lackluster wrestling games THQ released on the original Xbox. This is the first time a game in the SmackDown! series is featured in two different console generations. A steelbook version of the PlayStation 2 release was available exclusively in Australia.

A PlayStation 3 version was also planned but was eventually cancelled along with NBA Live 07. The developers publicly announced that they would rather concentrate their efforts on other game systems. The next installment, Smackdown vs. Raw 2008 was released for the PlayStation 3 and all future WWE games for the following 10 years have been released for the console. However, the PlayStation 2 version can be played on any PlayStation 3 models with PlayStation 2 backwards compatibility support. There was also consideration over releasing the game on the Wii as the game's developers were waiting to learn more about the system. However, during a video interview, creative manager Cory Ledesma announced there were no plans for it to be released on the Wii.

A special edition version for the Xbox 360 was sold for a limited time at EB Games and GameStop. This version featured the game in an aluminum case along with a bonus disc from The History of the WWE Championship DVD boxset and a copy of The Ultimate WWE Trivia Book.

Reception

SmackDown vs. Raw 2007 received highly positive reviews upon release.  According to video game review aggregator Metacritic, SmackDown vs. Raw 2007 received favorable reviews on all platforms. In Japan, Famitsu gave it a score of one eight and three sevens for the Xbox 360 version, and one five, one seven and two sixes for the PSP version.

The game received praise for presentation and the high amount of content, but was criticized for glitches, including commentary and ring announcing problems, and collision detection issues, with wrestlers being able to skip climbing an occupied ladder, making the Money in the Bank match extremely difficult. For example, if one wrestler is on top of the ladder, another wrestler may suddenly superplex him, without even climbing the ladder.

The match commentary and ring announcing were problematic in some arenas, such as WrestleMania and the Royal Rumble. These problems included a chair shot being referred to as a Stone Cold Stunner, a sweet chin music being referred to as an RKO, or a Khali chop being referred to as a back flip uranage slam. Similarly, the commentators may talk about wrestlers not even featured in the match, such as Lilian Garcia being heard announcing someone to the ring, despite the fact that Tony Chimel is in the ring, or Jim Ross and Jerry Lawler talking over Tazz and Michael Cole and vice versa. These bugs only occurred on the PS2 version, as the PSP version did not feature commentary and the Xbox 360 version had patched the commentary bugs.

The PlayStation 2 version of SmackDown vs. Raw 2007 received a "Platinum" sales award from the Entertainment and Leisure Software Publishers Association (ELSPA), indicating sales of over 300,000 copies in the United Kingdom.

See also

List of licensed wrestling video games
List of fighting games
List of video games in the WWE 2K Games series
WWE 2K

References

External links

2006 video games
Cancelled PlayStation 3 games
PlayStation 2 games
PlayStation Portable games
WWE SmackDown video games
WWE Raw video games
WWE video games
Xbox 360 games
Video games developed in Japan
THQ games
Yuke's games
Multiplayer and single-player video games
Professional wrestling games